HNS may refer to:
 hns, ISO 639-3 code for the Caribbean Hindustani language
  (Croatian Football Federation)
  (Croatian National Alliance) (1998-2004), a former political party in the Vojvodina region of Serbia
  (Croatian People's Party-Liberal Democrats), a political party in Croatia
 "Hack 'n' slay", alternate term for the Hack and slash video gaming genre
 Hacktivist News Service, a French alternative news service
 HNS, IATA and FAA LID code for Haines Airport in Alaska, United States
 Haruka na Sora, a Japanese video novel, sequel to Yosuga no Sora
 Hexanitrostilbene, an explosive
 HNS Convention, an international agreement on hazardous substances in the sea
 Sikorsky HNS-1, US Navy designation of the Sikorsky R-4 helicopter
 Hughes Network Systems, a subsidiary of Hughes Communications
 Huizhou Nanshan School, a private primary and secondary school in Guangdong, China
 Hyperosmolar nonketotic state, an alternate name for Hyperosmolar hyperglycemic state